Malik Amir Mohammad Khan (20 June 1910 – 26 November 1967) was the Nawab of Kalabagh and a prominent feudal lord, politician, the chief or sardar of the Awan tribe, and of his tribal estate Kalabagh, in Mianwali District of north western Punjab, Pakistan.

Early life
Nawab Malik Amir Mohammad Khan received his college education at Aitchison College, Lahore and then went on to finish his education at Oxford University in England.

Career
Nawab Malik Amir Mohammad Khan served as a member of the Provincial Assembly of Punjab from 1956 – 1958. He also served as Governor of West Pakistan from 1960 to 1966. He was appointed chairman Pakistan Industrial Development Corporation with the rank of a Central Minister in 1959, and subsequently Governor of West Pakistan on 12 April 1960 by Pakistan President General Ayub Khan.

His role during the Indo-Pakistan War of 1965 is praised, as he kept the law and order, controlled the prices, trafficked the raw material, and prevented smuggling.

Among the guests to his famous Kalabagh guest house, the Bohr Bangalow were Eleanor Roosevelt in 1952 and former Pakistani Presidents Iskander Mirza, Ayub Khan and Zulfikar Ali Bhutto.
 

General Jahandad Khan, who was military secretary to Nawab Malik Amir Mohammad Khan, the then governor of West Pakistan, wrote a book, Pakistan Leadership Challenges. In that book Nawab Malik Amir Mohammad Khan comes across as a sound, no-nonsense administrator, firmly wedded to the values and traditions of the feudal class. He was also considered "brutal," "ruthless" and "harsh" in both his public and private life. British assessment of the Nawab of Kalabagh was very similar. In his book Jahandad, Nawab Malik Amir Mohammad Khan's military secretary dismisses alleged rumours about a somewhat sinister aspect of the Ayub regime. In 1963, the regime faced strong opposition from the political party Jamaat-i-Islami. Ayub himself "felt gravely threatened by its head, Maudoodi." "Some sycophants" sought to persuade Ayub that "the physical elimination" of Maulana would bring peace to the country and that Malik Amir Mohammad Khan would help execute this attempt. Khan dismisses this as a baseless rumour in his above book.

Death 
It was widely reported in Pakistani news media that his third youngest son Asadullah Khan killed him over a family property dispute on 26 November 1967.

Descendants
His eldest son Nawab Malik Muzaffar Khan won a National Assembly seat from NW-44, Mianwali-I in the December 1970 elections. Nawab Malik Muzzafar Khan had three sons: the eldest Malik Idrees Khan, the second Malik Fareed khan and the youngest Malik Waheed Khan. Nawab Malik Idrees Khan became the Nawab of Kalabagh after his father’s death. He died without issue. After his death, his second Brother Nawab Malik Fareed Khan became Nawab. Nawab Malik Fareed Khan died in a vehicle accident. Thus his only son Nawab Malik Mohammad Ali Khan became Nawab of Kalabagh, a position he holds to this day. Nawab Malik Amir Muhammad Khan's second son Malik Allah Yar also remained a member of Majlis-e-Shoora during General Zia-ul-Haq's military regime. Amir Mohammad Khan's grandson from his third son, Malik Asad Malik Amad Khan, won the National Assembly seat from NA-71 Mianwali-I in the February 2008 elections as an independent candidate. Nawab Malik Amir Mohammad Khan's fourth and youngest son Malik Azam Khan was murdered in 1995. Malik Azam died without issue. His paternal granddaughter, Sumaira Malik, the daughter of his second son Malik Allahyar Khan, was a member of the National Assembly from 2004 until she was disqualified in 2013.

See also 
 Kalabagh Dam

References

Further reading
 Siysat ke Firauns, (Pharaohs of Politics), by Wakil Anjam, Ferozsons Limited, 1992. p. 423–436

1910 births
1967 deaths
 Governors of West Pakistan
 People from Mianwali District
 Aitchison College alumni
 Alumni of the University of Oxford
 Pakistani Sunni Muslims
 Pakistani landowners
 Punjabi people
Hashemite people
Alids
Awan
Alvis